Romance with Amelie is a 1982 East German drama film directed by Ulrich Thein. It was entered into the 32nd Berlin International Film Festival.

Cast
 Thomas Stecher - Jürgen Siebusch
 Brit Gülland - Amélie
 Gudrun Ritter - Mutter Siebusch
 Fritz Marquardt - Schwoffke
 Wilfried Ortmann - Donath
 Brigitte Lindenberg - Unsefrau
 Heinz Hupfer - Unsemann
 Wolfgang Dehler - Michelmann
 Friederike Aust - Carla
 Karla Runkehl - Frau Hillner
 Kurt Veth - Konny
 Viktor Proskurin - Kriegsgefangener
 Grigore Grigoriu - Panzerkommandant
 Anatoli Rudakov - Ortskommandant

References

External links

1982 films
East German films
1980s German-language films
1982 drama films
Films directed by Ulrich Thein
1980s German films